Vicente Romo Navarro (born April 12, 1943) is a Mexican former professional baseball pitcher. A right-hander, Romo played all or parts of eight seasons in Major League Baseball between 1968 and 1982, primarily as a relief pitcher. He had an extensive career in Mexico, where his career spanned 25 seasons from 1962–86, and he was elected to the Salón de la Fama del Beisbol Profesional de México (the Mexican Professional Baseball Hall of Fame) in 1992. He is the older brother of fellow major league pitcher Enrique Romo.

Professional career

Minor leagues 
Romo, who was nicknamed "Huevo" (meaning Egg in Spanish), began his professional career with the Tigres de Aguascalientes in the now-defunct Mexican Center League. He played for the Tigres del México in 1963–64, and was purchased from them by the Cleveland Indians on October 5, 1964.

Rookie year 
After three seasons in the minor leagues, mostly with the Portland Beavers Romo was selected in the Rule 5 draft by the Los Angeles Dodgers. He made his major league debut in the second game of the 1968 season, pitching one scoreless inning against the New York Mets. After going two weeks without appearing in a game, Romo was returned to the Indians on April 26. Romo was sent back to Portland, then was recalled at the end of June. During the last three months of the season, Romo appeared in 40 games for the Indians, posting a team-best 12 saves and a 1.62 earned run average.

Boston Red Sox 
Romo was traded along with Sonny Siebert and Joe Azcue from the Indians to the Boston Red Sox for Ken Harrelson, Dick Ellsworth and Juan Pizarro on April 19, . He shared closer duties with Sparky Lyle for most of the year, but was moved to the starting rotation in August. He made 11 starts down the stretch, posting a 5–2 record, including his only career shutout on September 18 against the Baltimore Orioles. Overall, he went 7–9 with 11 saves in 1969.

Romo began the 1970 season back in the bullpen, occasionally being called upon to make a spot start. In late July, he was moved back to the rotation once more, but this time did not fare as well. In eight starts, Romo went 0–3 with a 6.56 ERA, and he was moved back to the bullpen in September.

White Sox and Padres 
In 1971, Romo was traded at the end of spring training to the Chicago White Sox, where he spent two seasons as a middle reliever. He was traded again after the 1972 season to the San Diego Padres, where he was given a few more opportunities to close, leading the team in saves in 1974 with nine. Despite that, he was released by the Padres during spring training in 1975.

Return to Mexico 
Romo returned to his native Mexico, signing with the Cafeteros de Córdoba. He pitched four seasons with Córdoba, then three more with the Azules de Coatzacoalcos. His contract was purchased from Coatzacoalcos by the St. Louis Cardinals after the 1981 season, but was returned to the Azules before the 1982 season.

MLB comeback 
On May 24, 1982, Romo's contract was again purchased, this time by his original major league team, the Dodgers. Four days later, Romo made his first major league appearance in eight years, pitching two shutout innings against the Chicago Cubs. He was moved into the starting rotation in June to replace the injured Burt Hooton, but struggled, going 0–1 with a 5.40 ERA in his first four starts.

After one relief appearance, he pitched seven scoreless innings against the Montreal Expos on July 19 for his first major league victory since 1974, and first as a starter since 1970. Unfortunately, in his next start against the San Francisco Giants, he suffered a leg injury in the second inning and missed the rest of the season. His contract was sold back to the Azules after the season. He went on to pitch four more seasons in Mexico, finishing his career with the Leones de Yucatán in 1986.

Overview 
In an eight-season career, Romo posted a 32–33 record with a 3.36 ERA, 52 saves, and 416 strikeouts in 335 games pitched. In Mexico, he had a 182–106 record in 16 seasons, and holds the career record for best ERA with at least 2,000 innings pitched at 2.49. He also holds a number of Mexican Pacific League records.

See also
List of players from Mexico in Major League Baseball

References

External links

Retrosheet

1943 births
Living people
Azules de Coatzacoalcos players
Baseball players from Baja California Sur
Boston Red Sox players
Cafeteros de Córdoba players
Chicago White Sox players
Cleveland Indians players
Diablos Rojos del México players
Leones de Yucatán players
Los Angeles Dodgers players
Major League Baseball pitchers
Major League Baseball players from Mexico
Mexican Baseball Hall of Fame inductees
Mexican expatriate baseball players in the United States
Mexican League baseball pitchers
Portland Beavers players
San Diego Padres players
Tigres de Aguascalientes players
Tigres del México players
People from Santa Rosalía, Baja California Sur